Ventricle may refer to:

 Ventricle (heart), the pumping chambers of the heart
 Ventricular system in the brain
 Ventricle of the larynx, a structure in the larynx